Tahuna Normal Intermediate School is a school for Year 7 (Form One) and Year 8 (Form Two) students, based in Saint Kilda, Dunedin, New Zealand. It is located near Saint Kilda Beach.

Notes

External links
 Tahuna Normal Intermediate School

Schools in Dunedin
Intermediate schools in New Zealand